Methanobrevibacter curvatus is a species of methanogen archaeon. It was first isolated from the hindgut of the termite Reticulitermes flavipes. It is rod-shaped, ranging in size from 0.34 to 1.6 µm and possesses polar fibers. Its morphology, gram-positive staining reaction, resistance to cell lysis by chemical agents and narrow range of utilisable substrates are typical of species belonging to the family Methanobacteriaceae. It habitates on or near the hindgut epithelium and also attached to filamentous prokaryotes associated with the gut wall. It is one of the predominant gut biota.

References

Further reading

External links
LPSN

Type strain of Methanobrevibacter curvatus at BacDive -  the Bacterial Diversity Metadatabase

Euryarchaeota
Archaea described in 1996